Dudy Noble Field at Polk-Dement Stadium is a baseball park on the campus of Mississippi State University, just outside the city limits of Starkville, Mississippi. It's the home of the Mississippi State Bulldogs baseball team. DNF-PDS has been the setting of Southeastern Conference tournaments, NCAA Regional and Super Regional Championships, and it holds the current NCAA on-campus single-game attendance record at 15,586. It is known for the Left Field Lounge.

History
Mississippi State has been playing baseball at the present stadium site for 50 years, dating back to April 3, 1967, and a 5–3 Mississippi State win over Illinois Wesleyan.

What today stands as one of college baseball's top facilities grew in large part from the labors of Tom D'Armi, chief assistant coach to longtime Bulldog skipper Paul Gregory. When the tin-roofed grandstand and bleachers seating more than 2,000 were moved to the stadium's present site in the mid-1960s, it became D'Armi's task to "build" the new field. The task of hauling in and leveling top soil, planting and nurturing the turf, building the bullpens, placing signs on the outfield fence and planting the cedar trees beyond the outfield fence, fell to D'Armi. The hard work didn't go unrecognized. The field was subsequently honored by the U.S. Groundskeeper's Association as the nation's best maintained athletic field.

The facility was constructed on schedule by W.G. Yates & Sons of Philadelphia, Miss.

The Bulldog Club, MSU's athletic fund-raising body, shouldered a $2 million bonding program to account for the biggest portion of the project, with the remainder financed by alumni and friends through the sale of $1,000, $500 and $250 chairback seats, honorary deeds to plots of Dudy Noble Field turf, and other general donations.

For the book Inside Dudy Noble, A Celebration of Mississippi State Baseball, MSU alumnus John Grisham wrote an introduction about his time at MSU and in the Left Field Lounge.

The infield and portions of the adjoining outfield areas have in recent years been resodded, the infield dirt replaced, and the pitcher's mound rebuilt.

The green padding on the facing of the stadium wall was replaced prior to the 2002 season, and a new flooring material has been installed in both dugouts and the tunnels leading to them. The Bulldog locker room has been completely recarpeted, improved lighting added and new lockers installed, one of many projects funded by the four-year-old MSU Dugout Club.

Early in the 2004 season a speaker system was added near the concession stand area, while a new state-of-the-art scoreboard/message center was installed in the middle of the season beyond the existing scoreboard.

Also begun during the final week of the 2004 home season was the installation of wrought iron fencing and gates beneath the grandstand.

Additional stadium improvements are on the drawing board, all part of Mississippi State's commitment to maintain Dudy Noble Field, Polk–DeMent Stadium as the consummate collegiate ballpark for players and spectators alike.

In 2007 Dudy Noble held the largest crowd in super regional history of 13,715 in a victory over the Clemson Tigers that sent the Bulldogs to the College World Series in Omaha, NE.

Following the 2008 Season, a new larger Hi-Def video board replaced the 4-year old smaller screen along with a covering for the back of the scoreboard which displays the current year's baseball schedule. Planned renovations for the summer of 2009 include replacing all the out-dated drainage and pump systems below the field and all grass on the field.

In March 2013, Dudy Noble debuted a new mobile concessions ordering service — dawgsnax.com — with in-seat food delivery for fans in the grandstand seating area.

In 2017, Dudy Noble was mostly leveled to make way for an all-new Dudy Noble Field scheduled to be completed by the 2019 season. The 2018 season will be played at 3/4 capacity as the upper level will not be complete. The new management has announced plans to expand the exits to help accommodate fans leaving the ballpark early.

The Left Field Lounge

The Left Field Lounge is the area beyond the outfield fence.  It is unique in college baseball, and has enabled the grounds to be named the "#1 place to watch college baseball" and among the "100 things you gotta do before you graduate" by Sports Illustrated. In 2009 the lounge was named "the country's best tailgating experience" (among all sports venues) by ESPN Magazine.

Championships
Dudy Noble Field has hosted four SEC tournaments (1979, 1981, 1983, and 1988), one SEC Western Division Tournament (1995), three NCAA District III tournaments (1973-75), 15 NCAA Regional tournaments (1979, 1984, 1985, 1987, 1988, 1989, 1990, 1992, 1997, 2000, 2003, 2013, 2016, 2019 and 2021), and 4 Super Regionals (2007, 2016, 2019 and 2021.)

Attendance

SEC and Super Regional weekend games typically draw the largest crowds, giving rise to huge weekend gatherings. Mississippi State currently holds the NCAA record for the largest single game on-campus baseball attendance at 15,586 and the largest SEC crowd for a 3-game weekend regular season series at 39,181. In 2021 versus Notre Dame, MSU had the NCAA's top all-time highest attended Super Regional game with 14,385 fans. This 2021 Super Regional also had attendance of 13,971 and 11,754 in the other two games for an NCAA record attendance for a 3-game series of 40,140.

Mississippi State has 18 of the top 19 on-campus crowds in the history of college baseball. Overall, DNF-PDS has held 22 crowds over 12,000 and 58 crowds over 10,000.

In 2013, the Bulldogs ranked 4th among Division I baseball programs in attendance, averaging 7,617 per home game.

In 2012, college baseball writer Eric Sorenson ranked the stadium as the best big game atmosphere in Division I baseball.

Top baseball crowds at DNF-PDS

See also
 List of NCAA Division I baseball venues

References

External links
Dudy Noble Field/Polk-DeMent Stadium seating chart
Campus Map: Dudy Noble Field / Polk-Dement Stadium
Photo Gallery: Dudy Noble Field/Polk-DeMent Stadium 7/20/2010
Virtual Visit: Dudy Noble Field
Dudy Noble Field: The Venue
LeftFieldLounge.com
Left Field Lounge Tradition
Left Field Lounge represents the best of MSU

Baseball venues in Mississippi
College baseball venues in the United States
Buildings and structures in Oktibbeha County, Mississippi
Mississippi State Bulldogs baseball